Arthur Charles Edwards FRCO (1869 – 1940) was an organist and composer based in England.

Life
He was born in 1869 in Peterborough, the son of Amos Edwards, Bookseller, and Sarah Elizabeth. He was educated at King's School, Peterborough. He trained under Hugh Brooksbank at Llandaff Cathedral, and also at Southwark Cathedral.

He was awarded Mus Bac from St Edmund Hall, Oxford in 1891.

Appointments
Organist of St. Neot's Church, Huntingdonshire 1892
Deputy Organist at Llandaff Cathedral 1894
Organist of Framlingham College 1894 - 1896
Organist of Bridlington Priory 1896 - 1901
Organist of St. Andrew's Church, Croydon 1902 - 1906
Organist of Holy Trinity, Aberystwyth 1907 - 1937?

Compositions
He composed
I will lay me down in peace
Except the Lord build the house
Far down the ages now
Molique's March from Abraham
To faithful shepherds watching
Tarantella for pianoforte

References

1867 births
1940 deaths
English organists
British male organists
English composers
Fellows of the Royal College of Organists
People educated at The King's School, Peterborough
Alumni of St Edmund Hall, Oxford
Musicians from Cambridgeshire